Bypass may refer to:

 Bypass (road), a road that avoids a built-up area (not to be confused with passing lane)
 Flood bypass of a river

Science and technology

Medicine
 Bypass surgery, a class of surgeries including for example:
 Heart bypass
 Gastric bypass
 Cardiopulmonary bypass

Other
 Bypass capacitor, used to bypass a power supply or other high impedance component
 High bypass, a turbofan aircraft gas turbine engine
 Bypass duct
 Bypass ratio
 Bleach bypass, an optical effect
 Bypass switch, access port for an in-line active security appliance
 Bypass (telecommunications)
 Bypass valve
 A blowoff valve on a compressor
 A manual gas addition valve on a rebreather

Other uses
 The Bypass, a 2003 short silent Bollywood film
 Railroad bypass, a new railroad line built to replace or supplement an existing route

See also
 
 
 Pass (disambiguation)